The 2018 Okayama GT 300km was the first round of the 2018 Super GT Series. It was held at the Okayama International Circuit in Mimasaka, Okayama Prefecture, Japan. 

The GT500 category was won by Koudai Tsukakoshi and Takashi Kogure in the #17  Honda NSX-GT, whilst Yuhki Nakayama and Takashi Kobayashi won the GT300 category in the #18 Team UpGarage Toyota 86.

Race Report

Qualifying 
Rain affected both qualifying sessions for the GT500 and GT300 categories, which shuffled the grid owing to changing track conditions.

GT500 
In a what was tumultuous qualifying session, the #17  outfit piloted by Koudai Tsukakoshi and Takashi Kogure achieved pole position, after the #24 Kondō Racing Nissan GT-R of Mitsunori Takaboshi and João Paulo de Oliveira had set the pace in the first qualifying session. 2009 Formula One World Champion Jenson Button qualified fifth on his Super GT debut, whilst Swede Felix Rosenqvist qualified in fourth place, cementing a solid run in his debut. One of the biggest shocks to come out of qualifying was the defending champions Ryō Hirakawa and Nick Cassidy failing to get into the second part of qualifying.

GT300 
The qualifying session for the GT300 category was just as hectic. The Toyota 86 MC entries in the GT300 class appeared to be the pace setters throughout the weekend, with the #25 Tsuchiya Engineering entry of Takamitsu Matsui and Sho Tsuboi set the initial pace in Q1 with a time of 1:25.232. But, it was ultimately the #88 JLOC Lamborghini Huracán GT3 of Marco Mapelli and Kazuki Hiramine took the pole with a time of 1:33.925 in Q2.

Race

References 

Okayama